The 1956–57 Norwegian 1. Divisjon season was the 18th season of ice hockey in Norway. Eight teams participated in the league, and Tigrene won the championship.

Regular season

External links 
 Norwegian Ice Hockey Federation 

Nor
GET-ligaen seasons
1956 in Norwegian sport
1957 in Norwegian sport